The Ryūkyū national football team is a team representing the Ryukyuan people of the Ryukyu Islands, an archipelago under Japanese rule. It is not affiliated with FIFA or the AFC, and therefore cannot compete for the FIFA World Cup or the AFC Asian Cup.

Ryūkyū Football Association

The Ryūkyū Football Association is the football association of Ryukyu. It was founded in Okinawa City in 2014.

History

They competed in the 2018 CONIFA World Football Cup qualification, losing 9–0 to the United Koreans in Japan.

References 

Asian national and official selection-teams not affiliated to FIFA
Football in Japan
Ryukyuan people
CONIFA member associations